K – The Unknown is a 1924 American silent mystery film directed by Harry A. Pollard and starring Virginia Valli, Percy Marmont, and Margarita Fischer. It is based on the 1915 novel K. by Mary Roberts Rinehart.

Plot
As described in a film magazine, Sidney Page (Valli), glorious in the beauty and charm of young womanhood, awoke one day to the dazzling realization that she was the object of the affection of two mature men. Masculine affection was nothing new to her: from her schooldays she had been courted by two youths of her own age, and she had been considered the belle of the small city where she lived. “K” Le Moyne (Marmont), quiet, distinguished, mysterious, his presence in the city a mystery, intrigued her. Dr. Max Wilson (Roche), recently come to assume direction of the new hospital, swept her off her balance by the swiftness of his wooing. Herself studying to be a nurse, she came in close contact with him, even as she had with Le Moyne, who was a boarder in the home of the aunt with whom she lived. It was her interest in Le Moyne that was responsible for her breaking off sentimental association with two youths of her school days, George “Slim” Benson (Keith) and Joe Drummond (Ryan). Slim did not take his conge much to heart, although he and Joe had engaged in fierce quarrels concerning their position in the regards of Sidney. However, Joe was deeply affected; in time he was to do an act of desperation that had vital consequence in the lives of Sidney, Le Moyne, Dr. Wilson, and Carlotta Harrison (Fischer), who had come with Dr. Wilson to the hospital as his special nurse. The complications that came into the lives of these men and women brought tragedy in their wake, but they also brought happiness to two and the sad penalty of mourning over cold ashes of vengeance for another.

Cast

Preservation
A complete print of K – The Unknown is held in the collection of the UCLA Film and Television Archive that originally was at EYE Film Institute Netherlands.

References

Bibliography
 Theresa St. Romain. Margarita Fischer: A Biography of the Silent Film Star. McFarland, 2008.

External links

Still at silentfilmstillarchive.com

1924 films
1924 mystery films
American silent feature films
American mystery films
American black-and-white films
Films directed by Harry A. Pollard
Universal Pictures films
Films based on American novels
1920s English-language films
1920s American films
Silent mystery films